Gazi is one of the Central Iranian varieties of Iran, one of five listed in Ethnologue that together have 35,000 speakers.

Sources differ on whether Zefra'i is a dialect of Gazi or of Nayini.

References

Western Iranian languages